ģHellberg is a Swedish surname. Notable people with the surname include:

 Björn Hellberg (born 1944), famous sports journalist, author, tennis oracle and TV personality
 Magnus Hellberg (born 1991), Swedish ice hockey goaltender
 Martin Hellberg, German actor, director and writer
 Mattias Hellberg (born 1973), Swedish musician
 Niklas Hellberg, Swedish studio musician
 Owe Hellberg (born 1953), Swedish Left Party politician

See also 
 Helberg
 Hellborg
 Hillberg

Swedish-language surnames